Chadual is a village in Sirohi district in the Indian state of Rajasthan

Geography 
It is located about 25 km west of Sirohi.

Demographics 
This village has many castes including Purohit, Rawal Brahmin, Rajput, Jain, Suthar, Mali, Prajapat, Bhatt Brahmin, Dewasi, Boda Prajapat, Meghwal and Bheel.

Governance 
This village is represented by the Govt. Local Body Gram Panchayat tanwari.

Culture 
This village has many Hindu temples and also one Jain temple.

Gallery

References

Villages in Sirohi district